The Emancipator is an online newspaper on topics of racial justice, co-founded by Ibram X. Kendi of Boston University and Bina Venkataraman of The Boston Globe.

Development 

Ibram X. Kendi of Boston University and Bina Venkataraman of The Boston Globe met during the 2020 American protests for racial justice and shared a mutual interest in Boston's 19th-century abolitionist newspapers. They discussed William Lloyd Garrison's The Liberator and what a contemporary iteration would be like, modeled on Garrison's urgency and anti-gradualist approach to abolition.

In 2021, they began to assemble an online newspaper on the model of CBS's The 19th. They received a budget from their institutions and sought new individual and foundation donors. The name "The Liberator" had already been trademarked by a Christian nonprofit, so Kendi and Venkataraman chose "The Emancipator" based on another 19th-century abolitionist newspaper.

The Emancipator was launched in April 2022, with journalists Deborah D. Douglas and Amber Payne as co-editors-in-chief.

References

Further reading

External links 
 

2022 establishments
Anti-racism in the United States
Newspapers established in the 21st century
Newspapers published in Boston